The 1975 World Modern Pentathlon Championships were held in Mexico City, Mexico.

Medal summary

Men's events

Medal table

See also
 World Modern Pentathlon Championship

References

 Sport123

Modern pentathlon in North America
Modern pentathlon
Modern pentathlon
International sports competitions hosted by Mexico
Sports competitions in Mexico City
1970s in Mexico City